Alenka Rebula Tuta (born April 14, 1954) is a Slovene writer, poet, applied psychologist and a notable member of the Slovene minority in Italy. She lives and works in Sistiana in the Province of Trieste, Italy.

Life
She was born to father Alojz Rebula and mother Zora Tavčar, both notable Slovene writers. After finishing high school, with Slovene language as language of instruction in Trieste, she graduated from psychology at Trieste University. She married Igor Tuta, a radio program editor and director. They have two daughters and one son.

Work
Rebula initially worked as psychologist and is now teaching at the "Anton Martin Slomšek" College in Trieste. The book was reprinted in 2009. In 2010 Alenka Rebula took part in a TV documentary on her life and work, together with another notable woman author (Alenka Puhar) and her book "The Primal Text of Life" (in Slovene: "Prvotno besedilo življenja". The documentary was aired on National Television and Radio Station RTV Slovenija.

Poetry
1983 The Rainbow Shield (in Slovene: Mavrični ščit), ZTT, Trieste
2009 Embraced (in Slovene: V naročju), ZTT, Trieste

Prose
2010 100 Faces of Inner Strength (in Slovene: Sto obrazov notranje moči), Mladinska knjiga, Ljubljana

Psychology
1999 The Depths we are Born from (in Slovene: Globine, ki so nas rodile), Mohorjeva založba
2007 Feeling Blessed (in Slovene: Blagor ženskam), ZTT, Trieste

References

External links
www.alenkarebula.com, official website

Slovenian poets
1954 births
Living people
People from the Municipality of Sevnica